Martin Worthington is Associate Professor in Middle Eastern Studies at the Al Maktoum Centre for Middle Eastern Studies in the Department of Near and Middle Eastern Studies, Trinity College, Dublin. 
He was formerly senior lecturer in Assyriology at the University of Cambridge, and British Academy Research Fellow in the Dept of Near and Middle East at SOAS, University of London, with his research focused on Babylonian poems from the first millennium BC.
From 2006 to 2010 Worthington was a junior research fellow in Assyriology at St John's College, Cambridge. In 2011 Worthington was awarded the Sir George Staunton Prize from the Royal Asiatic Society.
In 2018 he directed the world’s first Babylonian-language film, The Poor Man of Nippur, which was shortlisted by the Arts and Humanities Research Council for the 2019 ‘Research in Film’ award.

Worthington worked with Marvel for the movie The Eternals, by providing them translations and recordings for part of the script in babylonian.

Selected publications

References

External links 

 Official page at Trinity College, Dublin.
 Lecture on "Translations and Literature in Ancient Mesopotamia", link.
 BBC Radio 4 In Our Time, "The Epic of Gilgamesh". Martin Worthington on the panel with Andrew R. George and Frances Reynolds.
 

Academics of SOAS University of London
21st-century British historians
Living people
Fellows of St John's College, Cambridge
Year of birth missing (living people)